Emmanuel Amunike (born 25 December 1970) is a Nigerian professional football manager and former professional football player who played as a winger. and is currently the assistant coach of Nigeria national team.

Playing career
He played for Zamalek, Sporting CP, Barcelona, and Albacete.

Amunike played 27 times for Nigeria, scoring nine goals. He was part of the team that participated at the 1994 FIFA World Cup in the United States, scoring against Bulgaria and Italy; also in that year, he helped the Super Eagles win the 1994 Africa Cup of Nations in Tunisia, eventually being voted African Footballer of the Year.

Additionally, Amunike played all the games at the 1996 Summer Olympics in Atlanta, scoring the winning goal in the final as the national team won the gold medal. Knee problems kept him out of the 1998 FIFA World Cup.

Managerial career
After retiring at the end of 2004, Amuneke moved to Cantabria in 2006, where he lived with his Spanish wife, Fatima, and also was taking his coaching courses. At the same time, he was also coaching some youth teams at SD Reocín. After a spell at Saudi club Al Hazm as an assistant coach, Amuneke took charge of the local Nigerian club Julius Berger F.C. in August 2008.

on 23 December 2008, Amuneke took on training duties for some teams in Nigeria, after completing two years of training courses in Europe. In November 2009, he took charge of Ocean Boys.

Amunike coached the Nigeria national U17 football team to win the World Cup in 2015. On 6 August 2018, he was appointed as the coach of the Tanzania national football team. He managed to qualify for the 2019 Africa Cup of Nations, but he resigned from training the team after losing all three games. In November 2019, he said he was looking for a new job.

Amunike was appointed the manager of Egyptian Premier League club, Misr Lel Makkasa SC in February 2021. In March 2021, his role was changed to director of academies.

Honours and achievements

Player
Zamalek
Egyptian Premier League: 1991–92, 1992–93
African Cup of Champions Clubs: 1993
CAF Super Cup: 1994

Sporting CP
Taça de Portugal: 1994–95
Barcelona
Copa del Rey: 1996–97
Nigeria
Africa Cup of Nations: 1994; runner-up: 2000
Olympic Games: 1996

Individual
African Footballer of the Year: 1994
BBC African Footballer of the Year: 1996

Manager
Nigeria national U17 football team
FIFA U-17 World Cup:  2015

Personal life
Amunike's younger brothers, Kingsley and Kevin, were also footballers. Both also played several years in Portugal, amongst other countries.

References

External links

Emmanuel Amunike at Kicker

1970 births
Living people
Nigerian footballers
Association football wingers
Zamalek SC players
Sporting CP footballers
FC Barcelona players
Albacete Balompié players
Busan IPark players
Al-Wehdat SC players
Nigeria Professional Football League players
Primeira Liga players
La Liga players
Segunda División players
Olympic footballers of Nigeria
Nigeria international footballers
1994 African Cup of Nations players
1994 FIFA World Cup players
1995 King Fahd Cup players
Footballers at the 1996 Summer Olympics
2000 African Cup of Nations players
Africa Cup of Nations-winning players
Olympic gold medalists for Nigeria
Olympic medalists in football
Medalists at the 1996 Summer Olympics
Nigerian expatriate footballers
Egyptian Premier League players
Tanzania national football team managers
2019 Africa Cup of Nations managers
Expatriate footballers in Egypt
Expatriate footballers in Portugal
Expatriate footballers in Germany
Expatriate footballers in Spain
Expatriate footballers in South Korea
Expatriate footballers in Jordan
Nigerian expatriate sportspeople in Egypt
Nigerian expatriate sportspeople in Germany
Nigerian expatriate sportspeople in Portugal
Nigerian expatriate sportspeople in Spain
Nigerian expatriate sportspeople in Saudi Arabia
Nigerian expatriate sportspeople in Sudan
Nigerian expatriate sportspeople in Tanzania
Nigerian expatriate sportspeople in South Korea
Nigerian expatriate sportspeople in Jordan
Expatriate football managers in Sudan
Expatriate football managers in Tanzania
Nigerian expatriate football managers
Nigerian football managers
Ocean Boys F.C. managers